Kinloss may refer to:

Places
 Kinloss Township, a township in Walsh County, in the State of North Dakota, USA
 Kinloss, Scotland, a village in Moray, Scotland
 Huron-Kinloss, a township in Bruce County, in Ontario Province, Canada

Institutions

Religious
 Kinloss Synagogue, a Synagogue in Finchley, North London, UK
 Kinloss Abbey, a Cistercian abbey at Kinloss, Scotland

Transportation
Kinloss railway station, a disused railway station in Kinloss, Scotland

Military
 Kinloss Barracks, a military installation for the 39 Engineers Regiment of the British Army. It is located on the Moray Firth in Scotland
 RAF Kinloss, a former RAF installation on the Moray Firth in Scotland. It has since been converted into Kinloss Barracks

People
13th Lady Kinloss, a Scottish peer

Titles
The Lord Kinloss, a title in the Scottish peerage

See also 
 Kinross, a settlement in Perth and Kinross, Scotland
 Kinross (disambiguation)